Bak Ji-yun (born 21 September 1992) is a South Korean judoka. She competed at the 2016 Summer Olympics in the women's 63 kg event, in which she was eliminated in the first round by Alice Schlesinger.

References

External links
 
 

1992 births
Living people
South Korean female judoka
Olympic judoka of South Korea
Judoka at the 2016 Summer Olympics
Judoka at the 2014 Asian Games
Asian Games medalists in judo
Asian Games silver medalists for South Korea
Medalists at the 2014 Asian Games
Universiade medalists in judo
Universiade silver medalists for South Korea
Medalists at the 2015 Summer Universiade
21st-century South Korean women